The 1994 FINA World Aquatics Championships were held in Rome, Italy between September 1 and September 11, 1994.

Medal table

Results

Diving

Men

Women

Open water swimming

Men

Women

Swimming

Men

Women

Synchronized swimming

Water polo
Men

Women

External links
 Swim Rankings results password required

 
Aquatics Championship
Aquatics Championship
FINA World Aquatics Championships
Aquatics Championship
World Aquatics Championships
September 1994 sports events in Europe
1990s in Rome